The associate minister of national defence is a member of the Canadian cabinet who is responsible for various files within the defence department as assigned by the prime minister or defence minister.

The position was created in 1940 during World War II under the War Measures Act along with the creation of a minister of defence for air and a minister of defence for naval services. These positions lapsed with the end of the war. The position of associate minister of defence was recreated in 1953 when the National Defence Act was amended to provide for the appointment in peacetime.

This post remained vacant under Prime Ministers Pierre Trudeau, Joe Clark and John Turner. Brian Mulroney revived the position but it was abolished under Kim Campbell when she decreased the size of the cabinet from 35 to 24 ministers. The post was also not used under Jean Chrétien.

This position reappeared on December 12, 2003, when Paul Martin chose his first cabinet and named Albina Guarnieri as the associate minister of national defence and minister of state for civil preparedness, and the portfolio passed to Mauril Bélanger in a subsequent reshuffle. Stephen Harper did not name anyone to the position until his May 18, 2011 reshuffle, when Julian Fantino was appointed to the portfolio. The position was left vacant by Harper in the July 15, 2013 cabinet shuffle.

Since forming government in 2015, Justin Trudeau has appointed the minister of veterans affairs as associate minister of national defence.

List of associate ministers of national defence

Cadieux and Hellyer were later appointed as minister of national defence.

References

Department of National Defence (Canada)
National Defence, Associate